Henry David Owen (August 26, 1920 – November 5, 2011) was a diplomat, Brookings Institution Director (1969–78) and United States Ambassador at Large for Economic Summit Affairs from 1977 to 1981, on the National Security Council.

Life
Owen was born in Forest Hills, Queens. He graduated from Birch Wathen Lenox School, and Harvard University with a BA in 1941.

He served in the United States Navy from 1942 to 1946 and on the U.S. State Department's Policy Planning Staff from 1952 to 1968. He recruited Zbigniew Brzezinski. He was director of foreign policy study, at the Brookings Institution, from 1969 to 1977.

He was a member of the American Academy of Diplomacy, Council on Foreign Relations, and Trilateral Commission.

References

External links

1920 births
2011 deaths
People from Forest Hills, Queens
United States Navy personnel of World War II
Harvard University alumni
Directors of Policy Planning
United States Ambassadors-at-Large
Birch Wathen Lenox School alumni